Alejandro Arteche (15 February 1923 – 12 November 1998) was a Spanish boxer who competed in the 1948 Summer Olympics.

References

1923 births
1998 deaths
Olympic boxers of Spain
Boxers at the 1948 Summer Olympics
Spanish male boxers
Light-heavyweight boxers